Cnemaspis podihuna, also known as Deraniyagala's day gecko or dwarf day gecko is a species of diurnal gecko found only in Sri Lanka.

Habitat and distribution
A small species of day gecko from arid regions of the east. Known from Lahugala Kitulana National Park in the Eastern Province. Recent records found the species from Koslanda, Badulla, Pallegama, Mathugama, Buttala, Central, Uva and Western Provinces.

Description
Snout short. Dorsal scales with smooth granules. Median sub-caudals are enlarged. Ventrals smooth. Glandular scales separate 4-5 pre-anal pores and 3-6 femoral pores on each side. 
Dorsum brown with four dark transverse markings.

Ecology & Diet
Found in boles and buttresses of trees.

Reproduction
Reproduction occurs year around, and generally 2 small eggs are laid at a time under loose tree barks, measuring 5.6 * 4.2mm. Nesting is not a communal.

References

 http://reptile-database.reptarium.cz/species?genus=Cnemaspis&species=podihuna
 https://www.academia.edu/1400878/Some_observations_of_Cnemaspis_podihuna_Deraniyagala_1944_Reptilia_Gekkonidae_Sri_Lanka
 http://www.wildreach.com/reptile/Serpentes/Aspidura%20copei.php

Reptiles of Sri Lanka
Cnemaspis
Reptiles described in 1944